Time's Laughingstocks and Other Verses is a collection of poems by English poet Thomas Hardy, and was published in 1909.  It includes poems of various dates, mainly concerned with rural, familial and provincial life.

Dates and thematics
The collection contains poems of various dates, with almost a third of its 94 poems having been published before the book's publication. A not untypical thematic stress on life's ironies is present, though Hardy himself was insistent that the title phrase was a poetic image only, and not to be taken as a philosophical belief. He also pointed out that behind the "I" of the poems stood not autobiography so much as "dramatic monologues by different characters".

Significant poems
Hardy himself considered "A Trampwoman's Tragedy" the best of all his poems. Gilbert Murray thought "He Abjures Love" had a Horatian quality; and Ezra Pound saw "The Revisitation" as anticipating Hardy's Poems 1912-13.

See also
 Casterbridge Fair

References

External links
 The complete text

1909 poems
English poetry collections
Poetry by Thomas Hardy